Parish Perry Petty (born August 5, 1988) is an American professional basketball player for Shahrdari Gorgan of the Iranian Super League. He played college basketball for Allen Community College, Santa Clara University and University of Texas–Pan American.

High school career
Petty played high school basketball at MacDowell Montessori School in Milwaukee, Wisconsin. Petty gained all-conference and honorable mention all-region his senior year but team lost in the first round of the state playoffs his senior year and made it to the quarterfinals his junior year.

College career
Petty played college basketball for Allen Community College, Santa Clara University and University of Texas–Pan American.

Professional career
On August 3, 2017, Petty joined Faros Larissas of the Greek Basket League.

On November 2, 2018, he joined Shahrdari Gorgan of the Iranian Super League. On April 24, 2021, he forced the game 4 of Iranian Basketball Super League final to over time with a 3/4 court shot with 0.3 seconds to go which eventually they win the game 110-103 and became the champions for the first time.

References

External links
ESPN.com Profile
Eurobasket.com Profile

1988 births
Living people
Allen Red Devils men's basketball players
American expatriate basketball people in Belarus
American expatriate basketball people in Greece
American expatriate basketball people in Hungary
American expatriate basketball people in Iran
American expatriate basketball people in Italy
American expatriate basketball people in Lebanon
American expatriate basketball people in Lithuania
American expatriate basketball people in Romania
American expatriate basketball people in Slovakia
American expatriate basketball people in Venezuela
American men's basketball players
Apollon Patras B.C. players
Basketball players from Milwaukee
BC Dzūkija players
BC Körmend players
BC Tsmoki-Minsk players
Gymnastikos S. Larissas B.C. players
Pallacanestro Virtus Roma players
Point guards
Reno Bighorns players
Santa Clara Broncos men's basketball players
Shooting guards
Szolnoki Olaj KK players
Texas–Pan American Broncs men's basketball players
Trotamundos B.B.C. players
Victoria Libertas Pallacanestro players
Shahrdari Gorgan players